Rustom is a 2016 Indian Hindi-language crime thriller film directed by Tinu Suresh Desai and written by Vipul K Rawal. The film is jointly produced by Cape of Good Films, Zee Studios, KriArj Entertainment,  Plan C Studios. It stars Akshay Kumar as Rustom Pavri - a navel officer, Ileana D'Cruz, Arjan Bajwa and Esha Gupta in lead roles. The film is loosely based on the K. M. Nanavati v. State of Maharashtra court case, and narrates the story of a naval officer Rustom, shares a happy relationship with his wife Cynthia. Soon, he discovers her affair with Vikram, a close friend, and is accused of murdering him.

Rustom received generally positive reviews from the critics for acting performances and writing of the film. It became a box office success grossing over  worldwide at the box office, was the fourth highest-grossing Hindi film of 2016 and fifth highest grossing Indian film of 2016.

At the 64th National Film Awards, Kumar received the National Film Award for Best Actor for his portrayal of the titular character.

Plot 
Officer Rustom Pavri is happily married to Cynthia Pavri in 1959, 12 years after the independence from the British colonial government. Their marriage hits the rocks when he discovers that she is having an affair with his friend Vikram Makhija. After returning early from his ship's deployment, Rustom discovers Vikram's love letters in Cynthia's cupboard. While trying to find her, Rustom sees them together. He returns home and waits for Cynthia to return and then confronts her with the love letters, but walks away before Cynthia can explain. Rustom then gets himself a pistol from the naval ship's armory and makes a trunk call to Defence Secretary K. G. Bakshi at Defence HQ, New Delhi. Afterwards, he searches for Vikram, first in his office and then at his home. After Rustom enters Vikram's bedroom, the servant hears three gunshots and rushes to the room, to discover Vikram killed with three bullets on his chest and Rustom walking away with the pistol in his hand. Rustom immediately surrenders to the police and Senior Inspector Vincent Lobo starts the investigation.

Vikram's sister Preeti Makhija meets with the public prosecutor, Lakshman Khangani to get Rustom the toughest punishment possible. Rustom refuses anybody's help and decides to fight the case on his own and prefers police custody. Rustom's senior naval officer, Rear Admiral Prashant Kamath, sends two goons to his house to search for a set of documents, but they fail to find anything. Scared, Cynthia rushes to jail to inform Rustom, who finally meets and listens to Cynthia's story, about how she was lonely and upset when Rustom went away to London for many months. With the connivance of Preeti, Vikram took advantage of Cynthia's loneliness and she fell for him. However, on the day of Vikram's murder, Cynthia had already broken-up with him for the sake of her marriage.  She was slapped by Vikram after she broke up with him and got injured and walked out of Vikram's house.

On Rustom's instructions, Cynthia blackmails Kamath for 5 crore in exchange for the vital documents he needed. In the court hearing, Rustom unexpectedly pleads not guilty in front of the Judge Patel, which leads to a 9-member jury trial. At the culmination of the trial, Rustom is found not guilty by the jury since he shot Vikram in self-defence. Meanwhile, it is found that Lobo was in Delhi and he had met Bakshi to obtain the recording of the trunk call that Rustom had made. When back in Bombay, the trunk call is played, convincing almost everyone that Rustom is guilty, and the court proceedings end for the jury to decide on their opinion.

On the eve of judgement day, Rustom tells Lobo the truth  he was posted in London in 1958  for several months inspecting an aircraft carrier that the Navy wants to purchase, but on inspection, it was found by Rustom that the carrier's hull was corroded, and it would have to be repaired and modified before the carrier could be transferred to India. Vikram was lobbying for the aircraft carrier to be bought by India, and he, along with Kamath, attempted to bribe him in order to convince him to say that the carrier is seaworthy. When Rustom attempted to notify Bakshi in London, Bakshi also attempted to bribe him and get the carrier to India. Vikram attempted to persuade him and Rustom then slapped him in disgust. Believing him to have showed the power of his uniform, Vikram had dated Cynthia to show Rustom his power of money and take revenge on him, but never really liked her for real. Rustom, angry at Vikram's revenge, took a pistol from the naval ship's armory, then called Bakshi telling him he wasn't going to spare Vikram and that he had papers exposing the carrier's unworthiness for the Navy. Rustom then went to Vikram's house and fatally shot him. Bakshi then sent Kamath to get the documents which Rustom said he had and on Lobo asking for the recording of the trunk call, gave him half the recording to hide his corruption. Rustom puts it thus that he did not reveal anything about the aircraft carrier so that the Navy would not have to be tainted with a corrupt image. Rustom then reveals that he never actually had any documents relating to the proof that the carrier was damaged.

The next day, Rustom is declared not guilty by the judge and the jury. Rustom and Cynthia walk out of the court with their heads held up high. The film ends with the Rustom and Cynthia couple on vacation after getting all Bakshi's commission money that Rustom got from Bakshi (involved in the deal at high level) for cutting the tape half. Rustom learned the result of the purchase after reading in the local newspaper about the carrier arriving in India in a robust condition, just as he had wished.

Cast 

 Akshay Kumar as Commander Rustom "Rusi" Pavri (based on real-life ex-naval officer K. M. Nanavati)
 Ileana D'Cruz as Cynthia Pavri, Rustom's wife (based on Sylvia Nanavati)
 Arjan Bajwa as Vikram Makhija, Rustom's close friend and Cynthia's love interest (based on Prem B. Ahuja)
 Esha Gupta as Preeti Makhija, Vikram's sister (based on Mamie Ahuja)
 Pavan Malhotra as Senior Inspector Vincent Lobo (based on DCP John Lobo)
 Usha Nadkarni as Jamnabai, Rustom's house maid servant
 Sachin Khedekar as Public Prosecutor Lakshman Khangani, Preeti's lawyer (based on Ram Jethmalani)
 Kumud Mishra as Erich Billimoria, the editor and publisher of Truth (based on Russi Karanjia who published Blitz)
 Anang Desai as Judge Patel
 Parmeet Sethi as Rear Admiral Prashant Kamath, Flag Officer Commanding Western Fleet (FOCWF)
 Indraneel Bhattacharya as Captain C. P. Cherian
 Kanwaljit Singh as Defense Secretary K. G. Bakshi
 Brijendra Kala as Head-Constable Tukaram Yadav
 Gireesh Sahedev as Lt. Commander Kamal Pujari
 Abhay Kulkarni as Sub-Inspector Umakant Patil
 Varun Verma as Lt. Bisht
 Sammanika Singh as Rosie Cost, the receptionist of Vikram's office
 Deepak Gheewala as Bhanabhai Warli, Vikram's house help
 Ishtiyak Khan as Chandu
 Naman Jain as Dagdu
 Subhashis Chakraborty as Ranjit Das, an hotel waiter
 Vipul K. Rawal as Captain
 Suresh Sippy as Chief saheb
 Rajesh S. Khatri as Damodar
 Samir Shah as Ramesh Shirke
 Haresh Khatri as Dr. Asher
 Homi Wadia as Advocate Sohrab Khandwala
 Mohit Satyanand as Jamshedji Jeejabhoy
 Ranjan Raj as Ticket Blackmailer
 Rama Kant Sharma as East Indian Jury

Production
The Rustom production filmed on location in Kent in April 2016 for the romantic montage where Rustom (Akshay Kumar) and Cynthia (Ileana D'Cruz) visit England including The Chequers Inn pub in Aylesford, Canterbury, Maidstone, Leeds Castle, Dover seafront and South Foreland Lighthouse. 
The Historic Dockyard Chatham also features for the naval port and ship scenes.

Kumar and Twinkle Khanna were sent legal notices for auctioning the costume worn by Kumar to portray the role of a naval officer. They were accused of "playing with the sentiments" of the armed forces.

Box office

India

The film was released alongside Mohenjo Daro on 2017 screens across India on 12 August 2016. Rustom collected approximately ₹14.11 crore on its opening day. The film collected ₹50 crore in its opening weekend and ₹90.9 crore in its first week in India.

International

The film also performed well internationally, grossing approximately $3 million in its opening weekend.

Soundtrack

Score
The film score was composed by Surinder Sodhi.

Songs

The songs featured in Rustom were composed by Arko, Raghav Sachar, Ankit Tiwari, and Jeet Gannguli, with lyrics written by Manoj Muntashir.

The first song from the film's soundtrack album, "Tere Sang Yaara", sung by Atif Aslam and composed by Arko was released on 6 July 2016. The second track of the film, titled "Rustom Vahi" was released on 13 July 2016. All lyrics are penned by Manoj Muntashir. The full music album was released on 14 July 2016.

On 29 October 2019, a new version of the song "Dhal Jaun Main" was released on the Zee Music Company's official YouTube Channel with Arijit Singh's vocals.

Awards and nominations

See also 
 Yeh Rastey Hain Pyar Ke (1963)

References

External links 
 
 
 
 

2016 films
Indian thriller drama films
Indian crime thriller films
Indian crime drama films
2016 thriller drama films
2016 crime thriller films
2016 crime drama films
2010s Hindi-language films
Films set in Mumbai
Films scored by Ankit Tiwari
Indian films based on actual events
Crime films based on actual events
Drama films based on actual events
Thriller films based on actual events
Hindi-language films based on actual events
Indian Navy in films
Indian courtroom films
Films about murder
Films about lawyers
Films set in 1958
Films set in 1959
Films featuring a Best Actor National Award-winning performance
Films scored by Surinder Sodhi
Films scored by Jeet Ganguly
Films scored by Raghav Sachar
Films scored by Arko Pravo Mukherjee
Films about Zoroastrianism